The 1915 Dallas Hilltoppers football team represented the University of Dallas during the 1915 college football season. Led by Charles Crowley in his third season as head coach, the team posted a 6–1 record and claims a Southwestern championship. The team's captain was Cecil Grigg.

Schedule

References

Dallas
Dallas Hilltoppers football seasons
Dallas Hilltoppers football